I complessi is a 1965 commedia all'italiana anthology film consisting of three episodes.

Cast 
Una giornata decisiva
Nino Manfredi: Quirino Raganelli
Ilaria Occhini: Gabriella  
Riccardo Garrone: Alvaro Morandini  
Umberto D'Orsi: Ernesto

Segment directed by Dino Risi, written by Marcello Fondato, Ruggero Maccari and Dino Risi.

Il complesso della schiava nubiana

Ugo Tognazzi: prof. Gildo Beozi 
Claudie Lange: Erminia  
Paola Borboni: Baracchi-Croce, Beozi's assistant
Nanda Primavera: Beozi's Mother-in-law
Claudio Gora: Antiquary
Carletto Sposito: Massimo Tabusso

Segment directed by Franco Rossi, written by Leonardo Benvenuti, Piero De Bernardi, Ettore Scola, Age & Scarpelli.

Guglielmo il dentone

Alberto Sordi: Guglielmo Bertone  
Franco Fabrizi: Francesco Martello 
Romolo Valli: Father Baldini 
Armando Trovajoli: Himself
Lelio Luttazzi: Himself
Nanni Loy: Himself
Vincenzo Talarico: Himself
Alessandro Cutolo: Himself
Edy Campagnoli: Herself
Kessler Twins: Themselves
Gaia Germani: Herself
Leo J. Wollemborg:  Himself
Pina Cei: Atelier Fabiani's Owner
Renato Terra: Contestant
Ugo Pagliai: Contestant
Piero Gerlini: Edoardo

Segment directed by Luigi Filippo D'Amico,  written by Rodolfo Sonego and Alberto Sordi.

External links 
 

1965 films
Italian black-and-white films
1960s Italian-language films
Commedia all'italiana
Italian anthology films
Films set in Italy
Films set in Rome
Films shot in Rome
Films directed by Dino Risi
Films directed by Franco Rossi
1965 comedy films
Films directed by Luigi Filippo D'Amico
Films with screenplays by Ruggero Maccari
Films with screenplays by Age & Scarpelli
1960s Italian films